This page indexes the individual year in Swedish music pages. Each year is annotated with a significant event as a reference point.


2010s - Pre-2010s

2010s
 2019 in Swedish music
 2018 in Swedish music, deaths of Bo Nilsson, Frank Andersson, Javiera Muñoz, Jerry Williams, Kenneth Gärdestad, Lill-Babs, and Stefan Demert.
 2017 in Swedish music, deaths of Björn Thelin, Boris Lindqvist, Folke Rabe, Ingvar Lidholm, Lars Diedricson, Rikard Wolff, Robert Dahlqvist, Siegfried Köhler, Sven-Erik Magnusson, and Tony Särkkä.
 2016 in Swedish music, deaths of Carina Jaarnek, Freddie Wadling, Fredrik Norén, Jacques Werup, Josefin Nilsson, Olle Ljungström, and Sydney Onayemi.
 2015 in Swedish music, deaths of Bengt-Arne Wallin, Kjell Öhman, and Peter Lundblad.
 2014 in Swedish music, death of Alice Babs, Christian Falk, and Mats Rondin.
 2013 in Swedish music
 2012 in Swedish music
 2011 in Swedish music
 2010 in Swedish music

Pre-2010s
 2009 in Swedish music

 Sweden
Sweden years
Swedish music-related lists